Michał Bartkowiak (born 3 February 1997) is a Polish professional footballer who plays as a right winger for German club Polonia Hannover.

Career

Bartkowiak started his career with Górnik Wałbrzych.

External links

References

1997 births
Living people
Association football midfielders
Polish footballers
Poland youth international footballers
Ekstraklasa players
I liga players
II liga players
III liga players
Górnik Wałbrzych players
Legia Warsaw players
Śląsk Wrocław players
Miedź Legnica players
Place of birth missing (living people)
Polish expatriate footballers
Expatriate footballers in Germany
Polish expatriate sportspeople in Germany